Oscar Flores Sánchez (June 22, 1907 – November 20, 1986) was a Mexican attorney and politician. He was Governor of the northern Mexican state of Chihuahua from 1968 to 1974 and the Attorney General of Mexico from 1976 until 1982.

References

1907 births
1986 deaths
Governors of Chihuahua (state)
Attorneys general of Mexico
Members of the Senate of the Republic (Mexico)
Politicians from Chihuahua (state)
People from Ciudad Juárez
20th-century Mexican politicians
Institutional Revolutionary Party politicians